Genta may refer to:
 Gentamicin, an aminoglycoside antibiotic
 Genta (company), biotechnology company
 Genta H. Holmes (born 1940), American professor of diplomacy
 Genta Matsuda (born 1999), member of Travis Japan
 (born 1986), Japanese footballer
 Gentiana Ismajli (born 1984), Albanian singer
, Japanese footballer
 Gérald Genta (born 1931), Swiss designer
 Giancarlo Genta (born 1948), Italian professor of mechanics
 Genta Kojima, fictional character in the Case Closed animated series
 Genta Umemori, fictional character in the Samurai Sentai Shinkenger

Japanese masculine given names